Rough Mountain Wilderness is a U.S. Wilderness Area in the Warm Springs Ranger District of the George Washington and Jefferson National Forests. The area has only one established hiking trail within its boundaries, and is characterized by steep slopes heading up to the ridgeline of Rough Mountain.

Recreation 
Rough Mountain Wilderness is so difficult to access that it never receives much use other than during hunting season.  In addition, the only reliable water sources exist just outside the Wilderness's boundaries and there are few flat spots suitable for camping.  
The only established trail in the Rough Mountain Wilderness, the Crane Trail, starts from possibly "the most remote trailhead" in the George Washington National Forest.  The trail itself only 3 miles long, but requires an out and back hike because private homes and hunting camps block access to Virginia State Route 42 at the western end of the trail.  The eastern trailhead is located next to railroad tracks leased by the Buckingham Branch Railroad from CSX Transportation, so access to the trail from either terminus may not be possible without trespassing.

It may also be possible to bushwack across the ridge of Rough Mountain to Griffith Knob starting from a parking lot north of the Wilderness boundaries.  This hike requires a 2.6 mile trek through an adjoining nonwilderness roadless area before reaching the Wilderness boundary.  It has been described as possibly "the loneliest hike in Virginia" in one guidebook.

See also
List of U.S. Wilderness Areas
Wilderness Act

References

External links 
 National Forest Web site 
 Wilderness.net 
 TopoQuest topographic map 
 Wikiloc record of hike on Crane Trail from Pad’s Creek to Rough Mountain ridgeline.
 Panoramio.com photo of Crane Trail’s eastern trailhead.

Wilderness areas of Virginia
George Washington and Jefferson National Forests
Protected areas of Alleghany County, Virginia
Protected areas of Bath County, Virginia